The UK Singles Chart is one of many music charts compiled by the Official Charts Company that calculates the best-selling singles of the week in the United Kingdom. Before 2004, the chart was only based on the sales of physical singles. This list shows singles that peaked in the Top 10 of the UK Singles Chart during 1992, as well as singles which peaked in 1991 and 1993 but were in the top 10 in 1992. The entry date is when the single appeared in the top 10 for the first time (week ending, as published by the Official Charts Company, which is six days after the chart is announced).

One-hundred and forty-five singles were in the top ten in 1992. Ten singles from 1991 remained in the top 10 for several weeks at the beginning of the year, while "Could It Be Magic" by Take That was released in 1992 but did not reach its peak until 1993. "Addams Groove" by MC Hammer, "Don't Talk Just Kiss" by Right Said Fred, "Justified & Ancient" by The KLF featuring Tammy Wynette, "Roobarb and Custard" by Shaft and "Too Blind to See It" by Kym Sims were the singles from 1991 to reach their peak in 1992. Twenty-seven artists scored multiple entries in the top 10 in 1992. Celine Dion, East 17, Kris Kross, Manic Street Preachers and Take That were among the many artists who achieved their first UK charting top 10 single in 1992.

The 1991 Christmas number-one, "Bohemian Rhapsody"/"These Are the Days of Our Lives" by Queen, remained at number-one for the first three weeks of 1992. The first new number-one single of the year was "Goodnight Girl" by Wet Wet Wet. Overall, twelve different singles peaked at number-one in 1992, with twelve unique artists having singles hit that position.

Background

Multiple entries
One-hundred and forty-five singles charted in the top 10 in 1992, with one-hundred and thirty-nine singles reaching their peak this year.

Twenty-seven artists scored multiple entries in the top 10 in 1992. American singer Michael Jackson and dance group The Shamen shared the record for the most top ten singles in 1992 with four hit singles each. Jackson's highest-charting single of the year was "Heal the World", which peaked at number two in November. He reached the top 10 with a further three singles in 1992: "In the Closet", which charted at number eight; "Who Is It" (number 10) and "Remember the Time" (number three). The Shamen also had four top ten entries in 1992, with their highest-charting single, "Ebeneezer Goode", spending four weeks at number-one. Solo artists CeCe Peniston, Madonna and Freddie Mercury, and bands Erasure, Take That and Guns N' Roses each reached the top 10 on three occasions.

Shakespears Sister were one of a number of artists with two top-ten entries, including the number-one single "Stay". Annie Lennox, The Cure, George Michael, Prince and U2 were among the other artists who had multiple top 10 entries in 1992.

Chart debuts
Forty-four artists achieved their first top 10 single in 1992, either as a lead or featured artist. Of these, three went on to record another hit single that year: Curtis Stigers, KWS and Undercover. CeCe Peniston and Take That both had two other entries in their breakthrough year.

The following table (collapsed on desktop site) does not include acts who had previously charted as part of a group and secured their first top 10 solo single.

Notes
Annie Lennox had prior chart success as a member of the duo Eurythmics but 1992 marked the start of her solo career, with "Why" becoming her first top 10 hit at number five.

Songs from films
Original songs from various films entered the top 10 throughout the year. These included "Addams Groove" (from The Addams Family), God Gave Rock 'N' Roll to You II (Bill & Ted's Bogus Journey), "My Girl" (My Girl), "Everything About You" (Wayne's World), "Beauty and The Beast" (Beauty and The Beast), "This Used To Be My Playground" (A League of Their Own), "The Best Things In Life Are Free" (Mo' Money), "End of the Road" (Boomerang) and "I Will Always Love You" and "Someday (I'm Coming Back)" (The Bodyguard).

Charity singles
The Comic Relief single for 1992, "(I Want to Be) Elected", was recorded by Rowan Atkinson, in character as his alter-ego Mr. Bean, alongside Bruce Dickinson from the rock band Iron Maiden. It was additionally credited to Smear Campaign which consisted of members of the group Skin (known at the time as Taste). The single peaked at number nine on 11 April 1992 (week ending).

A joint project by Manic Street Preachers and The Fatima Mansions raised money for The Spastics Society. The latter covered Bryan Adams' 1991 sixteen-week chart-topper "(Everything I Do) I Do It for You", with the formerdoing a version of Suicide Is Painless (Theme from M.A.S.H.)". The double A-side single peaked at number seven on 26 September 1992 (week ending).

Best-selling singles
Whitney Houston had the best-selling single of the year with a cover of "I Will Always Love You", from the soundtrack of the film The Bodyguard. The single spent fifteen weeks in the top 10 (including ten weeks at number-one), sold over 970,000 copies and was certified 2× platinum by the BPI. "Rhythm Is a Dancer" by Snap! came in second place, selling over 675,000 copies and missing out by around 295,000 sales. Charles & Eddie's "Would I Lie to You?", "Stay" from Shakespears Sister and "Please Don't Go"/"Game Boy" by KWS made up the top five. Singles by Boyz II Men, Erasure, Jimmy Nail, Michael Jackson and Wet Wet Wet were also in the top ten best-selling singles of the year.

"I Will Always Love You" (10) also ranked in the top 10 best-selling singles of the decade.

Top-ten singles
Key

Entries by artist

The following table shows artists who achieved two or more top 10 entries in 1992, including singles that reached their peak in 1991 or 1993 . The figures include both main artists and featured artists, while appearances on ensemble charity records are also counted for each artist.

Notes

 "Could It Be Magic" reached its peak of number three on 9 January 1993 (week ending).
 "My Girl" originally peaked outside the top ten at number 43 upon its initial release in 1965. It re-entered at number 92 in 1986. It was re-released as a single in 1992, following the November 1991 release of the film of the same name, which featured the song. As a result, it made the UK top ten for the first time, peaking at number two.
 "I Love Your Smile" originally peaked outside the top ten at number 55 upon its initial release in November 1991.
 "It Must Be Love" originally peaked at number 4 upon its initial release in 1981. It was re-released as a single in 1992 to coincide with the release of the greatest hits album Divine Madness.
 "Finally" originally peaked outside the top ten at number 29 upon its initial release in October 1991.
 Released as the official single for Comic Relief. 
 "(I Want to Be) Elected" was performed by Rowan Atkinson (in character as Mr. Bean) and Bruce Dickinson of Iron Maiden, with Smear Campaign made up of members of the group Skin (at that point known as Taste).
 "Raving I'm Raving" incorporated an unauthorised sample of the song "Walking in Memphis" and was subsequently banned from the charts.
 Nick Berry's cover of "Heartbeat" was used as the theme tune for the television series of the same name.
 "Blue Room" is the longest song ever to chart in the UK with a running time of 39:57. Earlier in the year, the Official Charts Company had extended the maximum song length for chart eligibility from 25 minutes to 40 minutes.
 "Sesame's Treet" is a remix of the theme song to the television series Sesame Street.
 "A Trip to Trumpton" includes samples from the 1960s television series of the same name.
 The original release of "Even Better Than the Real Thing" only charted at number 12 but the remix reached the top 10.
 "Even Better Than the Real Thing" was remixed by Paul Oakenfold.
 "Barcelona" originally peaked at number 8 upon its initial release in 1987.
 "This Charming Man" originally peaked at number 25 upon its initial release in 1983.
 Manic Street Preachers and The Fatima Mansions covered "Theme from M.A.S.H." and "Everything I Do (I Do It For You)" respectively. It was released as a double A-side single to raise money for The Spastics Society.
 "(Take a Little) Piece of My Heart" was first released in 1967. It was reissued after being used in a Levi's advertising campaign in 1992.
 "Who Needs Love (Like That)" originally peaked outside the top 10 at number 55 upon its initial release in 1985.
 The original version of "Temptation" peaked at number 2 upon its release in 1983.
 Figure includes a top 10 hit with the group Queen.
 Figure includes single that peaked in 1991.
 Figure includes single that peaked in 1993.
 Figure includes a top 10 hit with the group Iron Maiden.
 Figure includes an appearance on the Comic Relief single "(I Want to Be) Elected".
 Figure includes single that first charted in 1991 but peaked in 1992.

See also
1992 in British music
List of number-one singles from the 1990s (UK)

References
General

Specific

External links
1992 singles chart archive at the Official Charts Company (click on relevant week)
Official Top 40 best-selling songs of 1992 at the Official Charts Company

1992 record charts
1992 in British music
1992